Not Quite Dead Enough is a Nero Wolfe double mystery by Rex Stout published in 1944 by Farrar & Rinehart, Inc. The volume contains two novellas that first appeared in The American Magazine:
 "Not Quite Dead Enough" (abridged, December 1942)
 "Booby Trap" (August 1944)

In these two stories Archie Goodwin, Wolfe's live-in employee in all the other Nero Wolfe stories, wears the uniform of the United States Army.

Reviews and commentary
 Jacques Barzun and Wendell Hertig Taylor, A Catalogue of Crime — Neither is to be missed by anyone with an interest in the Wolfe-Goodwin saga.  In this one Archie has to incriminate himself to get Wolfe to abandon physical training and get back to ratiocination and both help win the war.  Full of amusing characters and with more action and fewer words than is sometimes true of the longer tales. ... Nero Wolfe does a neat job of selecting the culprit by arranging a booby trap of his own.  The final scene, in which Wolfe plays God, is unique: no beer, no audience except Archie (a major of three weeks' standing), and the murderer in a car in Van Cortlandt Park.

Publication history
1944, New York: Farrar & Rinehart, September 7, 1944, hardcover
In his limited-edition pamphlet, Collecting Mystery Fiction #9, Rex Stout's Nero Wolfe Part I, Otto Penzler describes the first edition of Not Quite Dead Enough: "Red cloth, front cover and spine printed with black; rear cover blank. Issued in a mainly black, red and blue pictorial dust wrapper. … The first edition has the publisher's monogram logo on the copyright page. the second printing, in the same year, is identical to the first except that the logo was dropped."
In April 2006, Firsts: The Book Collector's Magazine estimated that the first edition of Not Quite Dead Enough had a value of between $1,000 and $2,000.

1944, Toronto: Oxford University Press, 1944, hardcover
1944, New York: Detective Book Club #33, December 1944, hardcover
1944, New York: Detective Book Club, 1944, hardcover
1945, New York: Armed Services Edition #P-6, February 1945, paperback
1946, New York: Grosset & Dunlap, 1946, hardcover
New York: Lawrence E. Spivak, Jonathan Press #J27, not dated, paperback
1949, New York: Dell mapback #267, 1949, paperback
1963, New York: Pyramid (Green Door) #R-822, February 1963, paperback
1992, New York: Bantam Crimeline  October 1992, paperback, Rex Stout Library edition with introduction by John Lutz
1995, Burlington, Ontario: Durkin Hayes Publishing, DH Audio  July 1994, audio cassette (unabridged, read by Saul Rubinek)
2004, Auburn, California: The Audio Partners Publishing Corp., Mystery Masters  February 2004, audio CD (unabridged, read by Michael Prichard)
2010, New York: Bantam Crimeline  May 26, 2010, e-book

References

External links

Not Quite Dead Enough first edition dustjacket at the NYPL Digital Gallery

1944 short story collections
Nero Wolfe short story collections
Farrar & Rinehart books